The  (German: "heavy load-exerting body") is a large concrete cylinder located at the intersection of Dudenstraße, General-Pape-Straße, and Loewenhardtdamm in the northwestern part of the borough of Tempelhof in Berlin, Germany. It was built by Adolf Hitler's chief architect Albert Speer to determine the feasibility of constructing large buildings on the area's marshy, sandy ground. Erected between 1941 and 1942 it was meant to test the ground for a massive triumphal arch on a nearby plot. The arch, in the style of the Nazi architectural movement, was to be about three times as large as the Arc de Triomphe in Paris, France. It was one component of a plan to redesign the center of Berlin as an imposing, monumental capital reflecting the spirit of the Nazi Germany as envisioned by Hitler.

The  was built by Dyckerhoff & Widmann AG in 1941 at a cost of 400,000 Reichsmark (adjusted for purchasing power in today's currency around 1.69 million euros, about 2 million US dollars). It consists of a foundation with a diameter of  that reaches  into the ground and contains rooms which once housed instruments to measure ground subsidence caused by the weight of the cylinder, which was estimated as equivalent to the load calculated for one pillar of the intended arch.

Germania 
The  is one of the few remaining vestiges of Adolf Hitler's plans to remake the city of Berlin. After being appointed chancellor in 1933, Hitler was committed to redesigning Berlin in a way that prominently displayed 'national emblems of racial community'. The reconstruction of Berlin was initiated alongside the idea that this rebuilding would create and represent an eternal marking of Hitler's legacy and power. Hitler was at the forefront of the decision-making when it came to what was being built, where something was being built, and determining whether or not the structure properly exemplified the ideals of National Socialist power. Hitler and his architect, Albert Speer, planned to make Berlin into a "Monumental World Capital" called Germania.

A defining feature of Hitler's plans to redesign Berlin was that everything must be on a massive scale. The buildings themselves needed to convey a strong sense of sturdiness and uniformity. These large-scale designs and lofty ambitions are represented in the Olympic Stadium intended to host the 1936 Olympics in Berlin. Hitler also planned for a massive Winter Stadium designed with the capacity to hold at least 250,000 German citizens. The purpose of this hall was to create a permanent structure acting as the capital of the Third Reich, and the centerpiece of Germania that eternalized Hitler's strength, power, and influence.

With structures of such size being built on Berlin's soil for the first time, the ground needed to be tested. The  was built as a test for Hitler's Triumphal Arch. Hitler’s architects and engineers planned to measure the depth that the  sank into the ground. Work on the new capital was soon discontinued due to the onset of World War II and measurements at the cylinder ceased in June 1944.

Albert Speer 
The  is one of the few structures that still stand today by Hitler's chief architect, Albert Speer. Speer was born on March 19, 1905, in Mannheim, Germany to an upper middle-class family. Speer chose to study architecture like his father and grandfather. He studied at the University of Karlsruhe and transferred to the Technical University of Munich. Speer completed his postgraduate studies at the Technical University of Berlin before joining the Nazi party in 1931.

Hitler had appointed Speer as the inspector general of Berlin on 30 January, 1937. His task was redesigning Berlin as a center of National Socialism according to Hitler's vision and aspiration. According to Speer, Berlin was to be the "showpiece" of Hitler's and the Nazi regime's architectural self expression. Speer was also eager to fulfill Hitler's desires for massive buildings and monuments that encapsulated the regime's vision.

After World War II, Speer was convicted at the Nuremberg Trials, indicted on four counts, and served 20 years in prison.

Heavy load-exerting body 
In 1941, construction for the  began for the purpose of testing the load-bearing capacity of the ground on the planned site of Hitler's Triumphal Arch. The  was constructed by the French prisoners of war in forced labor camps. An analysis of the meticulous measurements only took place in 1948, revealing that the cylinder had sunk some  after two and a half years. The arch as conceived by Speer could only have been built after considerable prior stabilization of the ground.  

The cylinder itself was never initially intended by Hitler or Speer to be destroyed, but to be subsequently buried under a new road. Interrupted by the war, these plans never came to fruition.

After the end of World War II, the  no longer served a practical purpose. Without any more plans for the Triumphal Arch, the  remained an immovable 12,650 tonne cylinder. The  was used under the auspices of the Technical University of Berlin as part of a project to compile data about the city's geologic foundation up until 1977.

Public perception 
Removal of the cylinder was considered after the war, but because of its mass as well as nearby train tracks and apartment buildings, the structure could not be safely demolished with explosives. Since 1995 the monumental cylinder has been protected as a historical monument representing the "only tangible relic of National Socialist urban planning". The  acts as a standing reminder of the basis of Hitler's and Speer's elaborate plans for Berlin.  It is open to the public for viewing and guided tours.

References

Further reading
 Roger Moorhouse, Berlin at War: Life and Death in Hitler's Capital, 1939–1945, Bodley Head, 2010.

External links

 Additional photographs
  Information in German and partially in English about the site and the visiting hours
 

Buildings and structures in Berlin
Nazi architecture
Concrete buildings and structures
Towers completed in 1941
Albert Speer buildings
In situ geotechnical investigations